The 2009 Challenger de Providencia was a professional tennis tournament played on outdoor red clay courts. It was part of the 2009 ATP Challenger Tour. It took place in Providencia, Chile between 9 and 15 March 2009.

Singles entrants

Seeds

Rankings are as of March 2, 2009.

Other entrants
The following players received wildcards into the singles main draw:
  Gastón Gaudio
  Guillermo Hormazábal
  Hans Podlipnik-Castillo
  Guillermo Rivera Aránguiz

The following players received entry from the qualifying draw:
 Jorge Aguilar
 Luigi D'Agord
 Alejandro Kon
 Flávio Saretta
 Alejandro Fabbri (as a Lucky loser)
 Gonzalo Tur (as a Lucky loser)

Champions

Men's singles

 Máximo González def.  Mariano Zabaleta, 6–4, 6–3

Men's doubles

 Horacio Zeballos /  Sebastián Prieto def.  Flávio Saretta /  Rogério Dutra da Silva, 7–6(2), 6–2

Challenger de Providencia - Copa Cachantun
Tennis tournaments in Chile
Cachantún Cup (ATP)
Cach